The FC/ASW ("Future Cruise/Anti-Ship Weapon"), FMAN/FMC ("Futur missile anti-navire/Futur missile de croisière" in French) or SPEAR 5 is a programme launched by France and the United Kingdom to develop a missile system to replace their jointly-developed Storm Shadow/SCALP as well as their respective Exocet and Harpoon anti-ship missiles. Equally funded by both countries, the project is led by European missile manufacturer MBDA and is a product of the close defence relationship set out between both nations by the Lancaster House treaties.

The concept study of the FC/ASW, unveiled in 2011 at the Salon du Bourget in Paris, was called Perseus or CVS401 Perseus (named after the Greek hero Perseus), a stealth hypersonic cruise missile concept study undertaken by MBDA in consultation with the Royal Navy and French Navy. It was produced by 10 engineers working on the design for six months.

In 2017, an agreement for the launch of a concept phase of the programme was signed between the two countries and, in March 2019, MBDA announced the key review of the programme was successfully completed in cooperation with the French Defence Procurement Agency (DGA) and the British Defence Equipment and Support (DE&S). 

On 18 February 2022, an agreement and associated contracts signed by the head of the DGA, his British counterpart and the CEO of MBDA confirmed the launch of the preparation works for the FC/ASW.  

The program appears to now be pursuing two complementary missile concepts: a low observable subsonic cruise missile and a supersonic highly manoeuvrable missile; with the apparent discontinuation of a hypersonic solution.

History 

At the 2016 UK–France Security Summit, the two parties pledged to work on a "joint concept phase for the FC/ASW programme to identify solutions for replacement of the Scalp/Storm Shadow missiles for both countries, Harpoon for the UK and Exocet for France." In the 2018 United Kingdom-France Summit, the FC/ASW programme was further affirmed. 

In July 2021, then Secretary of State for Defence Jeremy Quin, responded to a question on the in-service date for FC/ASW, stating: "The planning assumption for service entry for Future Cruise /Anti-Ship Weapon on the Type 26 Frigate and Typhoon aircraft is 2028 and 2030 respectively".

In September 2021 the signing of a Memorandum of Understanding to progress the project was postponed by France in response to the AUKUS security pact which saw Australia cancel the acquisition of French-designed conventional submarines in favour of nuclear submarines based on United States and UK technology. In November the First Sea Lord, Admiral Tony Radakin, told the House of Commons Select Defence Committee that options for FC/ASW were still "being looked at" including potential hypersonic weapons. Were a collaborative approach still to be pursued, this might delay the introduction of these weapons until the 2030s.

In 2022, the UK and France signed a government agreement and associated contracts as part of the FC/ASW program.  This also came with the announcement that the program had begun assessing two complementary concepts for the missile's design:

 A subsonic low observable missile.
 A supersonic missile with high manoeuvrability.
There's still no firm confirmation if the program will produce either a single system from one of these two concepts capable of equally engaging in the anti-Ship and land-attack roles or produce both concepts as separate weapons: a stealthy subsonic cruise missile primarily focusing on land attack, and a supersonic missile focusing more on anti-shipping. However, the press release's description of "complementary concepts" in addition other MBDA marketing material showing two separate weapons has reinforced the latter hypothesis. Interestingly, the program appears to have discounted the potential development of a hypersonic missile, instead choosing to invest further in well-established subsonic/supersonic propulsion systems.

Characteristics
The FC/ASW (Perseus Concept) is powered by a ramjet motor, is 5 metres in length, weighs around 800 kg and has a payload comprising one 200 kg main and two 50 kg subsidiary warheads.  These warheads can either directly contribute to the overall impact or be ejected from lateral bays before the missile reaches its target, in effect acting as submunitions. This unique feature allows a single Perseus to either strike several targets in the same general area or to strike a single large target (such as an aircraft carrier) in several different areas simultaneously, with the aim of maximising damage.

"In this case, a linear attack pattern could be selected, munitions striking the forward, centre and aft sections simultaneously. If a unitary blast is required, then the effectors remain on board the parent missile to add their blast effect to the central warhead."

Two types of attack profiles are envisaged: a high-altitude approach, for engaging land-based targets; and a sea-skimming low-altitude approach terminating in a 'pop-up' engagement when dealing with surface threats like enemy warships.

The missiles "skimming the sea at wave top" followed by a pop-up manoeuvre would only allow an estimated 3 second response time for enemy warships.

The missiles concept sensor suite includes:
 A multi-mode active e-scan radar with synthetic aperture radar and Doppler beam sharpening.
 A laser radar (lidar) for terminal phase imaging and target recognition.
The missile also features a "semi-active laser guidance capability." MBDA believes that this guidance method will remain important for time-sensitive targeting for many years to come. Satellite datalink is to be incorporated for in-flight re-targeting, using thin-profile, low-observable active antenna arrays."

The missile will be VLS launched and is compatible with the American Mark 41 Vertical Launching System (to be fitted on the Royal Navy's Type 26 frigates) and the French A70 Sylver VLS (currently fitted on the FREMM of the French navy).

Potential operators
 France
 French Air Force
 French Navy
 United Kingdom
 Royal Air Force
 Royal Navy

See also
 P-800 Oniks – a Russian supersonic anti-ship missile of the same range class.
 BrahMos – an Indo-Russian supersonic anti-ship missile derived from the P-800.
 YJ-12 – a Chinese supersonic anti-ship missile of the same range class.
 ASM-3 – a Japanese supersonic anti-ship missile of the same range class.

References

Notes

External links
 Video - MBDA Concept Vision 2011 "Perseus"
Anti-ship cruise missiles
Cruise missiles of the United Kingdom
Cruise missiles of France
Proposed weapons